First Baptist Church is a historic Baptist church located at Asheville, Buncombe County, North Carolina. It was designed by architect Douglas Ellington and built in 1925–1927. It is a four-story, domed, polygonal brick building with Art Deco design influences.  The front facade features a colossal hectastyle portico.

It was listed on the National Register of Historic Places in 1976.

References

20th-century Baptist churches in the United States
Baptist churches in North Carolina
Churches on the National Register of Historic Places in North Carolina
Art Deco architecture in North Carolina
Churches completed in 1927
Churches in Asheville, North Carolina
National Register of Historic Places in Buncombe County, North Carolina
Church buildings with domes